Hédard Albert, (born in Saint-Simon, New Brunswick), is a New Brunswick politician.

Albert worked for 35 years at the CCNB (francophone branch of the New Brunswick Community College system) fisheries school where he taught, conducted research and served as school administrator.  He was also involved in Canadian International Development Agency programs to develop fisheries abroad.

He was elected as a Liberal to the Legislative Assembly of New Brunswick in the 2003 general election to represent the riding of Caraquet and was re-elected in 2006.

Following the 2003 election, he served in the opposition shadow cabinet as critic for Intergovernmental and International Relations, Official Languages and Culture & Sport.

Following the 2006 election, he became a cabinet minister.

References 
 MLA Bios, Government of New Brunswick

Members of the Executive Council of New Brunswick
New Brunswick Liberal Association MLAs
Acadian people
Living people
Year of birth missing (living people)
21st-century Canadian politicians